Arnuwanda II was a king of the Hittite Empire (new kingdom) ca. 1330 BC (middle chronology) or 1322–1321 BC (short chronology). He succeeded his father Suppiluliuma I, who succumbed to the plague which Egyptian captives from his Canaan campaign had brought with them to the Hittite heartland.

Biography 
Later Hittite documents reveal that Arnuwanda had also caught this plague. His younger brother Mursili helped him with Hatti's ongoing struggles against the Kaska and Arzawa lands. In one such event, the brothers wrote to Karkiya that they would provide asylum to Manapa-Tarhunta of Seha River, who had been ousted in a coup. As a result, Manapa-Tarhunta was able to return to Seha River as its leader. (Unfortunately Manapa-Tarhunta proved faithless anyway a few years later.)

Arnuwanda eventually died of the plague and was succeeded by his brother Mursili. While Arnuwanda had long been groomed by Suppiluliuma I to be the latter's successor and was respected by Hatti's enemies, Mursili is stated in the Hittite records to be relatively young and inexperienced upon his unexpected accession to the throne.

In fiction

 Janet Morris wrote a detailed biographical novel, I, the Sun, whose subject was Suppiluliuma I.  Arnuwanda II is an important figure in this novel, in which all characters are from the historical record, which Dr. Jerry Pournelle called "a masterpiece of historical fiction" and about which O.M. Gurney, Hittite scholar and author of The Hittites, commented that "the author is familiar with every aspect of Hittite culture". Morris' book was republished by The Perseid Press in April 2013.
 He is also a character in Chie Shinohara's historical manga Red River or Anatolia Story. In this manga he is a frail-bodied man who appoints Yuri's boyfriend, his half-brother Mursili, as his successor. He is later murdered in very shady circumstances, and Yuri is falsely accused of killing him but her maid Ursula claims that she's the true murderer and is executed. The culprit isn't found until much later.
 Arnuwanda II also appears in the Historical novel, "Amarna Book I: Book of Ida" by Grea Alexander.  In it, he is pitted against his brother, Mursili II, who is protecting Queen Ankhesenamun's emissary, Idaten, following the murder of their brother Prince Zannanza. This book was published by SeaMonkey Ink, LLC in 2012 and is the first of a three part trilogy.

See also

 History of the Hittites
 Hittite plague

References

External links
Reign of Arnuwanda II

1320s BC deaths
Hittite kings
Year of birth unknown
14th-century BC rulers